Rai Ladinia is a Ladin-language radio and television service broadcasting to people in Ladinia. The service is owned by RAI, the public broadcaster of Italy.

References

External links
Official Website

Ladin language
Television channels and stations established in 1988
RAI television channels
Television in minority languages